Trust is the second album of the British boy band / pop group Brother Beyond, released in 1989, by EMI / Parlophone (later re-released by Gong label). It was their last album, since they disbanded. After their two major hits, "The Harder I Try" and "He Ain't No Competition", written for them by famous producers Stock, Aitken and Waterman, the band, as lead singer Nathan Moore puts it on his Official Website, "made the classic mistake of thinking they did not need Stock Aitken and Waterman... We wrote the whole of the next album ourselves and (it) bombed totally". The three singles taken from the Trust album were only minor hits, getting no higher than the UK Top 40. The first, "Drive On", which was also the opening track of Side 2 on the vinyl edition, got to Number 39, in October 1989. The second, "When Will I See You Again?", a soulful ballad by The Three Degrees (written by popular composing duo Gamble & Huff), stopped at Number 43, in December 1989. The third and last, "Trust", the title-track and opener to the whole album, stalled at Number 53, in March 1990.

EMI America gave the band a push to conquer the USA market, and the American release of the album, which was released in mid-1990, dropped one song, "Universal", and added two new songs, which were released as singles: "The Girl I Used to Know" and "Just A Heartbeat Away" produced by American producers Carl Sturken and Evan Rogers. "The Girl I Used to Know" was released as the lead single off the album in the US and became a top 40 hit in the Billboard Hot 100, peaking at No. 27. It was released as a non-album single in Europe in early 1991, and peaked at No. 48 in the UK.

Track listing

Charts

Certifications

Singles from the album
 "Drive On" (1989)
 "When Will I See You Again?" (1989)
 "Trust" (1990)
 "The Girl I Used to Know" (1990)
 "Just A Heartbeat Away" (1990)

Personnel
Nathan Moore – lead vocals
David White – guitar
Carl Fysh – keyboards
Steve Alexander – drums, percussion

Musicians
Dizzie Heights – rap track 5
Beverley Skeete, Claudia Fontaine, Janice Hoyte, John Sloman, Leroy Osbourne – background vocals
Phil Palmer – guitar
Phil Todd – saxophone
Guy Barker – trumpet, flugelhorn
Andy Wright – keyboards
Jeff Lorber, Steve Pigott – keyboards, programming

Production
Brother Beyond – production tracks 5 & 10
Jeff Lorber – production & arrangement tracks 1 to 4, 6 to 9
Keith Cohen – production & engineering tracks 1 to 4, 6 & 9; mix tracks 1, 2, 6 & 9
Nick Webb – mastering
Hugo Nicolson – engineering tracks 7 & 8; additional engineering tracks 3 & 4
Steve "Barney" Chase – additional engineering tracks 3 & 4
Adam Moseley – engineering, production & mix tracks 5 & 10; additional engineering track 8
Pete Schwier – mix tracks 3 & 8
Bryan "Chuck" New – mix tracks 4 & 7

Staff
Michael Roberts – photography
The Leisure Process – design and art direction
Simon Carter, Steve Margo for Management One – management
Friends of Brother Beyond; London – fan club
Gerry Barad for Brockum; London, New York City, Toronto, Sydney – merchandising
Clive Black, Loraine Trent – special collaborators

Release details

References

External links
Discogs: cover, product details, track listing and credits of the Trust album, with links to all related performers.
Nathan Moore Official: includes a detailed history and discography of Brother Beyond.
MySpaceTV: short clip of Brother Beyond being interviewed in 1988.

1989 albums
Brother Beyond albums
Albums produced by Adam Moseley